Pärnu Võrkpalliklubi is a professional Estonian volleyball team based in Pärnu, Estonia. It plays in the Baltic Volleyball League and the Estonian Volleyball League. The team won the 2015–16 Baltic Volleyball League title.

Team roster

2021/2022

Honours
Baltic League
 Winners: 2016
 Runners-up: 2011, 2013, 2017, 2018
Estonian League
 Winners: 1993, 2000, 2001, 2002, 2003, 2004, 2015, 2019
 Runners-up: 1994, 1995, 1996, 1997, 1999, 2010, 2013, 2016, 2022
Estonian Cup
 Winners: 1992, 1993, 1999, 2000, 2001, 2002, 2003, 2012, 2014, 2015, 2016
 Runners-up: 1998, 2004, 2009, 2010, 2018

Head coaches
1992–2001  Andrei Ojamets
2001–2004  Pasi Sakari Rautio
2005–2011  Andrei Ojamets
2011–2014  Urmas Tali
2014–2022  Avo Keel

Notable players
  Kristjan Kais (4 seasons: 1992–1996)
  Avo Keel (5 seasons: 1999–2004)
  Argo Meresaar (9 seasons: 1996–2004; 2007–2008)
  Jaanus Nõmmsalu (8 seasons: 1997–2004; 2010–2011)
  Raimo Pajusalu (6 seasons: 1998–2004)
  Dmytro Pashytskyy (1 season: 2009–2010)
  Hindrek Pulk (3 seasons: 2014–2017)
  Andrus Raadik (10 seasons: 2006–2016)
  Janis Sirelpuu (2 seasons: 2003–2004; 2009–2010)
  Timo Tammemaa (2 seasons: 2014–2016)
  Renee Teppan (2 seasons: 2010–2012)
  Andres Toobal (4 seasons: 2006–2009; 2011–2012)
  Kert Toobal (4 seasons: 1998–2002)
  Rivo Vesik (5 seasons: 1998–2003)

References

External links
 Official website 

Estonian volleyball clubs
Sport in Pärnu